The district of Rother, one of six local government districts in the English county of East Sussex, has more than 130 current and former places of worship.  83 active churches and chapels, one mosque and one Buddhist centre serve the mostly rural area, and a further 49 former places of worship still stand but are no longer in religious use.  The district's main urban centres—the Victorian seaside resort of Bexhill-on-Sea and the ancient inland towns of Battle and Rye—have many churches, some of considerable age.  Others serve villages and hamlets scattered across the Wealden hills and marshes of the district.  Even small settlements have parish churches serving the Church of England, the country's state religion.  Roman Catholicism is less well established than in neighbouring West Sussex, but Protestant Nonconformist denominations have been prominent for centuries.  Methodism was especially popular in the area: many chapels were built in the 18th and 19th centuries, although some have since closed.  The majority of the population is Christian, and the mosque and Buddhist centre in Bexhill-on-Sea are the only non-Christian place of worship.

Dozens of buildings have been awarded listed status by English Heritage in recognition of their architectural and historical interest.  These range from the Saxon-era parish churches in villages such as Beckley and Guestling to the Mediterranean-style Romanesque Revival St Anthony of Padua Church in Rye, built in the 1920s.  Likewise, chapels as simple as the cottage-like former Bethel Chapel in Robertsbridge and as elaborate as the "rich and fruity" neighbouring United Reformed Church have been listed.

Various administrative areas operated by the Church of England, the Roman Catholic Church, the United Reformed Church, Baptists and Methodists cover churches in the district which are part of their denomination.  These areas include dioceses, archdeaconries, networks and circuits.

Overview of the district and its places of worship

It is one of five districts and boroughs in the county; its western boundary is the district of Wealden, and it surrounds the borough of Hastings to the south. The boroughs of Tunbridge Wells and Ashford and the district of Folkestone and Hythe in the neighbouring county of Kent form Rother's northern and eastern border. The district is named after the River Rother, which enters the English Channel at Rye. Approximately 90,000 people live in the district, of whom about half are residents of the largest town and administrative centre, Bexhill-on-Sea. The only other towns, both with ancient origins, are Rye and Battle. The rest of the district is mostly undulating High Wealden countryside punctuated with small, historic villages.

Sussex—the Kingdom of the South Saxons—was one of the last parts of England to be Christianised.  It was isolated from other parts of the country because of the thick forest that covered it.  When St Wilfrid and his missionaries brought Christianity to the area in the 7th century, they arrived by sea. The new religion quickly spread; the longest established churches in the present Rother area are apparently St Peter's Church in Bexhill's old town and All Saints Church at Icklesham, both founded in 772 (but no 8th-century fabric remains at either location). Many more churches were built in the Saxon era, but most were either superseded by larger Norman buildings between the 11th and 13th centuries—as at Sedlescombe and Whatlington—or substantially added to, as at Icklesham. Many places also gained their first church during this period, and the size and opulence of some (such as Ticehurst and Salehurst) reflect the area's iron-industry wealth at the time. Nevertheless, some parishes were initially very large: for example, both Bodiam and Etchingham were served from Salehurst parish church until their own churches were built in the 14th century.

By the 19th century, few villages lacked an Anglican church, and attention turned to restoring and reconstructing ancient buildings—although places such as Hurst Green, Netherfield, Staplecross and Telham did receive churches of their own, often built as chapels of ease to distant parish churches.  Some ancient churches still retain most of their medieval fabric and appearance, but churches such as Dallington, Northiam and Sedlescombe were so comprehensively rebuilt in the mid-19th century that they now have a largely Victorian appearance.  (Wholesale restoration of churches in the then-fashionable Gothic Revival style was a common and much criticised practice during the Victorian era.) In the 20th century, Anglican churches continued to be provided as residential development spread along the English Channel coast east of Hastings.  Building styles varied: at Winchelsea Beach, old-fashioned brick, timber and tile-hanging were used in 1962; at Fairlight Cove, a square wooden box-like structure, intended to be both temporary and portable, has stood since 1970; in Camber, the 1956 replacement for a bombed-out chapel of ease is in an old-fashioned early-20th-century style; and at Cliff End on Pett Level an unusual building was purchased and reused.  The Admiralty installed a Lifesaving Rocket Apparatus Station on the beach; in 1935 it was converted into the tiny St Nicholas' Church.

After the English Reformation, Roman Catholic worship was illegal in England for nearly 250 years until 1791, and it grew slowly thereafter in comparison to West Sussex, where many large estates were owned by gentry who secretly kept the faith over many generations. Ill-feeling towards Catholics apparently persisted well into the 19th century in Battle, where the 1886 Church of Our Lady Immaculate and St Michael was set well back from the street (in the garden of its presbytery) and does not have an ecclesiastical appearance. In the early 20th century, bolder architectural statements were made with the Gothic Revival church at Bexhill-on-Sea and the elaborate Italian Romanesque-style church at Rye, both of which are listed buildings. Most of the other Roman Catholic churches in Rother district are simple mid-20th-century buildings, sometimes with distinguishing architectural features such as a modernistic portico-style entrance at the former church at Sidley, dalle de verre glass at Burwash and a Mediterranean-style blank-arcaded tower at Little Common.

Of the various Protestant Nonconformist denominations, Methodism has been especially prominent since the 18th century.  Chapels built for Wesleyan Methodists are particularly numerous and can be found in many villages, although many have closed (Methodist worship has been in decline nationwide since the early 20th century). John Wesley himself was a frequent visitor to the area, and the church he founded at Rye in 1789 was the administrative base of a vast Circuit covering much of Sussex and Kent. His last ever outdoor sermon was preached beneath a tree near Winchelsea Methodist Chapel. The Methodist Statistical Returns published in 1947 recorded the existence of two chapels of Wesleyan origin in Northiam and one each at Battle, Beckley, Bexhill, Broad Oak, Burwash Weald, Catsfield, Crowhurst, Dallington, Etchingham, Hurst Green, Iden, Little Common, Mountfield, Peasmarsh, Robertsbridge, Rye, Staplecross, Ticehurst, Udimore, Wadhurst and Whatlington in addition to the Winchelsea chapel.  There were also United Methodist (originally Bible Christian) chapels at Icklesham, Pett, Three Oaks and Westfield and a single Primitive Methodist chapel, Christ Church, at Bexhill. Almost all of these buildings still stand, but only the chapels at Broad Oak, Little Common, Pett and Rye remain in religious use by Methodists, along with the two at Bexhill and a newly built church centre at Battle which opened in 2014.

Rye was a hotbed of Nonconformist worship: a religious census in 1676 found 300 Nonconformists in the town, more than ten times as many as in the much larger parish of Salehurst, which had the next highest number. In 1847, chapels existed for Methodists, Presbyterians, Independents, Baptists, Quakers and Unitarians; Congregationalists, the Salvation Army and Jehovah's Witnesses also set up places of worship in the town later; and the Baptists split into several groups and have occupied five buildings over the years—all of which still stand. Elsewhere, Baptist churches can also be found in Battle, Bexhill and Sidley; Quakers now meet in Bexhill; and members of the United Reformed Church, formed by a union of the Congregational Church and the Presbyterian Church of England in 1972, worship in Ashburnham, Bexhill and Sedlescombe and also used a chapel in Robertsbridge until 2015. In the second half of the 20th century, Pentecostal churches became established in Beckley (registered in 1956), Bexhill and Crowhurst (1991).

Religious affiliation
According to the United Kingdom Census 2011, 90,588 people lived in Rother.  Of these, 64.81% identified themselves as Christian, 0.51% were Muslim, 0.19% were Jewish, 0.32% were Buddhist, 0.19% were Hindu, 0.01% were Sikh, 0.58% followed another religion, 25.24% claimed no religious affiliation and 8.16% did not state their religion. The proportion of Christians was higher than the 59.38% in England as a whole, and the proportions of people claiming adherence to another religion or no religious affiliation were also higher in Rother than nationally (the figures for England as a whole were 0.43% and 24.74% respectively).  The percentage of people in Rother not answering this census question was also higher than the 7.18% nationally.  Other religions named in the census had much lower proportions of followers than in England overall—the corresponding national percentages were 5.02% for Islam, 1.52% for Hinduism, 0.79% for Sikhism, 0.49% for Judaism and 0.45% for Buddhists.

Administration
All Anglican churches in Rother district are part of the Diocese of Chichester, whose cathedral is at Chichester, and the Lewes and Hastings Archdeaconry—one of three subdivisions which make up the next highest level of administration. In turn, this archdeaconry is divided into eight deaneries. The churches at Flimwell, Stonegate and Ticehurst are in the Rural Deanery of Rotherfield. The Rural Deanery of Rye covers 23 churches in the district: Beckley, Bodiam, Brede, Camber, East Guldeford, Ewhurst Green, Fairlight, Fairlight Cove, Guestling, Icklesham, Iden, Northiam, Peasmarsh, Pett, Pett Level, Playden, Rye, Rye Harbour, Staplecross, Udimore, Westfield, Winchelsea and Winchelsea Beach. Those at Brightling, Burwash, Burwash Common, Dallington, Etchingham, Hurst Green, Mountfield, Netherfield, Robertsbridge and Salehurst are part of the Rural Deanery of Dallington. The Rural Deanery of Battle and Bexhill administers the churches at Ashburnham, Battle, Catsfield, Crowhurst, Penhurst, Sedlescombe, Telham and Whatlington, the five churches in Bexhill-on-Sea and those in the suburbs of Little Common and Sidley.

The Roman Catholic Diocese of Arundel and Brighton, whose cathedral is at Arundel, administers the district's six Roman Catholic churches.  The churches at Battle, Bexhill-on-Sea, Little Common, Northiam (Horn's Cross) and Rye are all part of Eastbourne and St Leonards-on-Sea Deanery, as was the former church at Sidley. The church at Burwash is in Mayfield Deanery. Little Common is served as a Mass Centre from St Mary Magdalene's Church in Bexhill-on-Sea, as was Sidley until its closure. The churches at Battle and Northiam are part of a joint parish.

The Hastings, Bexhill and Rye Methodist Circuit, a 13-church administrative area, covers eight Methodist churches in Rother—at Battle, Bexhill-on-Sea (Christchurch, Little Common and Sackville Road), Brede (Trinity), Pett, Rye and Winchelsea.

The four United Reformed Churches in the district as of 2011, at Ashburnham, Bexhill-on-Sea, Robertsbridge, and Sedlescombe, were part of the West Kent and East Sussex Synod Area of the Church—a group of 32 churches within the Southern Synod region. Robertsbridge United Reformed Church was also in this area until its closure in 2015, and Ashburnham Chapel closed in 2013 but remains in use as a non-denominational church.

Of the five extant Baptist churches in the district, four are administratively part of the East Sussex Network of the South Eastern Baptist Association: the churches at Battle, Rye and Sidley, and Beulah Baptist Church in Bexhill-on-Sea.  The former Bethel Strict Baptist Chapel at Rye, which closed in 2018, was affiliated with the Gospel Standard movement.

Listed status
English Heritage has awarded listed status to more than 50 current and former church buildings in Rother.  A building is defined as "listed" when it is placed on a statutory register of buildings of "special architectural or historic interest" in accordance with the Planning (Listed Buildings and Conservation Areas) Act 1990. The Department for Culture, Media and Sport, a Government department, is responsible for this; English Heritage, a non-departmental public body, acts as an agency of the department to administer the process and advise the department on relevant issues. There are three grades of listing status. Grade I, the highest, is defined as being of "exceptional interest"; Grade II* is used for "particularly important buildings of more than special interest"; and Grade II, the lowest, is used for buildings of "special interest". As of February 2001, there were 40 Grade I-listed buildings, 75 with Grade II* status and 1,991 Grade II-listed buildings in Rother.

Current places of worship

Former places of worship

See also
List of demolished places of worship in East Sussex

Notes

References

Bibliography

 (Available online in 14 parts; Guide to abbreviations on p. 6)

Rother
Rother
Rother
Rother District